Rudolph the Red-Nosed Reindeer is a fictional reindeer created by Robert L. May. Rudolph is usually depicted as the ninth and youngest of Santa Claus's reindeer, using his luminous red nose to lead the reindeer team and guide Santa's sleigh on Christmas Eve. Though he initially receives ridicule for his nose as a fawn, the brightness of his nose is so powerful that it illuminates the team's path through harsh winter weather.  Ronald D. Lankford, Jr., described Rudolph's story as "the fantasy story made to order for American children: each child has the need to express and receive approval for his or her individuality and/or special qualities. Rudolph's story embodies the American Dream for the child, written large because of the cultural significance of Christmas."

Rudolph first appeared in a 1939 booklet written by May and published by Montgomery Ward, the department store.

The story is owned by The Rudolph Company, LP and has been adapted into numerous forms including the song by Johnny Marks, Rudolph the Red-Nosed Reindeer, Rudolph's Shiny New Year, and Rudolph and Frosty's Christmas in July from Rankin/Bass Productions, as well as Rudolph the Red-Nosed Reindeer: The Movie and Rudolph the Red-Nosed Reindeer and the Island of Misfit Toys from GoodTimes Entertainment. Character Arts, LLC manages the licensing for the Rudolph Company, LP and DreamWorks Classics.  In many countries, Rudolph has become a figure of Christmas folklore. 2014 marked the 75th anniversary of the character and the 50th anniversary of the Rankin/Bass television special. A series of postage stamps featuring Rudolph was issued by the United States Postal Service on November 6, 2014.

Publication history
Robert L. May created Rudolph in 1939 as an assignment for Chicago-based Montgomery Ward. The retailer had been buying and giving away coloring books for Christmas every year and it was decided that creating their own book would save money. May considered naming the reindeer "Rollo" or "Reginald" before deciding upon using the name "Rudolph". May said his daughter liked reindeer, and he said he was treated like Rudolph as a child. In its first year of publication, Montgomery Ward distributed 2.4 million copies of Rudolph's story. The story is written as a poem in anapestic tetrameter, the same meter as "A Visit from St. Nicholas" (also known as Twas the Night Before Christmas"). Publication and reprint rights for the book Rudolph the Red-Nosed Reindeer are controlled by Pearson PLC.

While May was pondering how best to craft a Christmas story about a reindeer, while staring out his office window in downtown Chicago, a thick fog from Lake Michigan blocked his view—giving him a flash of inspiration. "Suddenly I had it!" he recalled. "A nose! A bright red nose that would shine through fog like a spotlight."

The cultural significance of a red nose has changed since the story's publication. In 1930s popular culture, a bright red nose was closely associated with chronic alcoholism and drunkards, so the story idea was initially rejected. May asked his illustrator friend at Montgomery Ward, Denver Gillen, to draw "cute reindeer", using zoo deer as models. The alert, bouncy character Gillen developed convinced management to support the idea.

Maxton Books published the first mass-market edition of Rudolph in 1947 and a sequel, Rudolph the Red-Nosed Reindeer Shines Again, in 1954. In 1992, Applewood Books published Rudolph's Second Christmas, an unpublished sequel that Robert May wrote in 1947. In 2003, Penguin Books issued a reprint version of the original Rudolph the Red-Nosed Reindeer with new artwork by Lisa Papp. Penguin also reprinted May's sequels, Rudolph Shines Again and Rudolph's Second Christmas (now retitled Rudolph to the Rescue).

Story
The story chronicles the experiences of Rudolph, a youthful reindeer buck who possesses an unusual luminous red nose. Mocked and excluded by his peers because of this trait, Rudolph proves himself one Christmas Eve with poor visibility due to inclement weather. After Santa Claus catches sight of Rudolph's nose and asks Rudolph to lead his sleigh for the evening, Rudolph agrees and is finally favored by his fellow reindeer for his heroism and accomplishment.

In media

Theatrical cartoon short (1948)

Rudolph made his first screen appearance in 1948, in a cartoon short produced by Max Fleischer for the Jam Handy Corporation that was more faithful to May's original story than Marks' song, which had not yet been written. It was reissued in 1951 with the song added.

Song (1949)

May's brother-in-law, Johnny Marks, adapted the story of Rudolph into a song.  Gene Autry's recording of the song hit No. 1 on the Billboard pop singles chart the week of Christmas 1949.  Autry's recording sold 2.5 million copies the first year, eventually selling a total of 25 million, and it remained the second best-selling record of all time until the 1980s.

View-Master reels (1950, 1955)
The stereoscope View-Master version of the story was issued and copyrighted by Sawyer's on August 1, 1950, as a 14 frame, 7 image reel and numbered "FT-25". The text was provided by Thomas L. Dixon and the model and diorama work by Florence Thomas. A follow-up 3 reel packet, also with Thomas involved, was copyrighted on September 10, 1955. These showcased new stories by Robert L. May: Rudolph, the Red-Nosed Reindeer and J. Baddy, the Brilliant Bear (FT-26), Rudolph, the Red-Nosed Reindeer and Uncle Bigby, the Blue-Nosed Reindeer (FT-27) and Rudolph, the Red-Nosed Reindeer Shines Again (FT-28). Later reissue packets of the 1960s and beyond replaced the FT-28 version with the 1950 FT-25 version. The 1955 packet was promoted on television at the time by Arlene Francis.

Comic books (beginning in 1950)
DC Comics, then known as National Periodical Publications, published a series of 13 annuals titled Rudolph the Red-Nosed Reindeer from 1950 to 1962. Rube Grossman drew most of the 1950s stories.

In 1972, DC Comics published a 14th edition in an extra-large format.  Subsequently, they published six more in that format: Limited Collectors' Edition C-20, C-24, C-33, C-42, C-50 and All-New Collectors' Edition C-53, C-60.

Additionally, one digest format edition was published as The Best of DC #4 (March–April 1980). The 1970s Rudolph stories were written and drawn by Sheldon Mayer.

Children's book (1958)
In 1958, Little Golden Books published an illustrated storybook, adapted by Barbara Shook Hazen and illustrated by Richard Scarry. The book, similar in story to the Max Fleischer cartoon short, is no longer in print, but a revised Little Golden Books version of the storybook was reissued in 1972.

Stop-motion animation television special (1964) and sequels (1976–1979)

Perhaps the most well-known version of all the Rudolph adaptations is New York-based Rankin/Bass Productions' Christmas television special in 1964. Filmed in stop-motion "Animagic" at Tadahito Mochinaga's MOM Productions in Tokyo, Japan, with the screenplay written by Romeo Muller and all sound recordings (with supervision by Bernard Cowan) done at the RCA studios in Toronto, Ontario, Canada, the show premiered on NBC. As the producers of the special, Arthur Rankin, Jr. and Jules Bass, only had the song as source material and did not have a copy of the original book, they interpolated an original story around the central narrative of the song, one that differed from the book. This re-telling chronicles Rudolph's social rejection among his peers and his decision to run away from home. Rudolph is accompanied by a similarly outcast elf named Hermey, who skipped elf practice to become a dentist, along with a loud, boisterous, eager prospector named Yukon Cornelius who was in search of wealth. Additional original characters include Rudolph's love interest, Clarice; the antagonistic "Abominable Snow Monster of the North"; and, as narrator, Sam the living Snowman, voiced by Burl Ives.

In the 1964 stop-motion movie, Rudolph is born to Donner the reindeer and Donner's wife. He is discovered by Santa to have a shiny, glowing red nose. For a while he hides this quality that makes him different, but when his nose is discovered and he is ostracized, Rudolph runs away with Hermey, an elf who also considers himself a misfit. On their aimless journey, they run into Yukon Cornelius, and attempt to stay away from the Bumble, a huge abominable snow monster. Their journey leads them to the Island of Misfit Toys, where sentient but unorthodox toys go when they are abandoned by their owners. When Rudolph returns, he discovers his family went to look for him and must be rescued. Then Santa announces that due to bad weather Christmas must be cancelled. Santa changes his mind when he notices Rudolph's red nose and asks Rudolph to lead the sleigh team, which he happily accepts.

After the story's initial broadcast, its closing credits were revised. Images of wrapped presents being dropped from Santa's sleigh were replaced by a scene in which Santa stops to pick up the Misfit Toys and delivers them to the homes of children below via umbrellas (with the exception of the misfit toy bird that swims but does not fly who is dropped to its destination). The changes were prompted by viewer feedback pleading for a happy ending for the Misfits Toys as well.  The special now airs annually on CBS, rather than NBC, and is hailed as a classic by many. The special's original assortment of characters have acquired iconic status.

The success and popularity of the special led to two sequels Rudolph's Shiny New Year (1976) which continued the reindeer's journeys, and the series was made into a trilogy with the feature-length film Rudolph and Frosty's Christmas in July (1979), which integrated the Rudolph universe into that of Rankin/Bass's adaptation of Frosty the Snowman (1969). Being one of the most popular Rankin/Bass characters, Rudolph also made his cameo appearances in two "Animagic" specials Santa Claus is Comin' to Town (1970) and Nestor, the Long–Eared Christmas Donkey (1977), and in the Easter television special The First Easter Rabbit (1976) with cel animation by Toru Hara's Topcraft.

Animated feature-length films

Rudolph the Red-Nosed Reindeer: The Movie (1998) is an 2D-animated feature film presented by GoodTimes Entertainment and Golden Books Family Entertainment (now Western Publishing), and produced by Tundra Productions in Hollywood, California. It received only a limited theatrical release before debuting on home video. Its inclusion of a villain, a love interest, a sidekick, and a strong protector are more derivative of the Rankin/Bass adaptation of the story than the original tale and song (the characters of Stormella, Zoey, Arrow, Slyly, and Leonard parallel the Rankin/Bass characters of the Bumble, Clarice, Fireball, Hermey, and Yukon Cornelius, respectively). The movie amplifies the early backstory of Rudolph's harassment by his schoolmates (primarily his cousin Arrow) during his formative years. It was produced and directed by William R. Kowalchuk, and written by Michael Aschner, with music and songs by Al Kasha and
Michael Lloyd, and with most of the casting being assembled at BLT Productions in Vancouver, British Columbia. The film's recording facilities were Pinewood Sound in Vancouver, Schwartz Sound in New York, and Wally Burr Recording in Hollywood. Among the all-star cast of voices were American actors John Goodman, Whoopi Goldberg, Debbie Reynolds, Richard Simmons and Bob Newhart, British actor Eric Idle, and Canadian actress Kathleen Barr as Rudolph. Animation production services for the film were outsourced to Colorland Animation Productions in Hong Kong.

GoodTimes Entertainment, the producers of Rudolph the Red-Nosed Reindeer: The Movie, brought back most of the same production team for a CGI animated sequel, Rudolph the Red-Nosed Reindeer and the Island of Misfit Toys (2001). Unlike the previous film, the sequel featured the original characters from the Rankin/Bass special (as GoodTimes soon learned that Rankin/Bass had made a copyright error that made the characters unique to their special free to use).

Other
A live-action version of Rudolph (complete with glowing nose) along with Donner and Blitzen appears in the Doctor Who Christmas special, "Last Christmas" which was broadcast on BBC One on 25 December 2014. In this special, Santa is able to park him like a car and turn off his nose.

Nathaniel Dominy, an anthropology professor at Dartmouth College (Robert L. May's alma mater), published a scholarly paper on Rudolph's red nose in the open access online journal Frontiers for Young Minds in 2015. In the paper, Dominy noted that reindeer eyes can perceive shorter wavelengths of light than humans, allowing them to see ultraviolet light; ultraviolet light, however, is much more easily scattered in fog, which would blind reindeer. Thus, Rudolph's red nose, emitting longer-wavelength red light, would penetrate the fog more easily. A summary of Dominy's findings was released in an Associated Press article on December 22.

Cast and characters

Homages in media

Film
 In the film remake of Dr. Seuss's How the Grinch Stole Christmas (2000), The Grinch disguises his dog, Max, as Rudolph for his plan to disguise himself as Santa Claus and steal everything in each house in Whoville, to stop Christmas from coming. He also changes Rudolph's story saying, he hates Christmas and is gonna steal it. He then yells "Action!" through a megaphone. But Max takes off the fake red nose the Grinch had put on him.
 In the film Fred Claus (2007), Rudolph is mentioned and briefly seen, although his red nose is not glowing. During a fly-by shot of Fred (Vince Vaughn) piloting Nick's sleigh, Rudolph can be seen, and nine reindeer can be counted. In the same film, a billboard advertisement for Pepsi Cola, which features Rudolph, can be seen as Fred crashes through it.

Games
 Rudolph is mentioned in the video game Army of Two (2008) during a tutorial video about the use of the game's Aggro feature.
 In Guild Wars Nightfall (2006), player characters are accompanied by a reindeer named Rudy whose nose begins to glow red when coming into range of presents that the player is tasked to find in a holiday themed quest.

Music
 Rudolph is mentioned in the Beach Boys' song "Little Saint Nick" (1963) in the following lyric: "Now haulin' through the snow at a frightening speed with a half a dozen deer with Rudy to lead."
 "Run Rudolph Run" (1958) is a Christmas song by Chuck Berry and sometimes credited to Johnny Marks and Marvin Brodie and published by St. Nicholas Music (ASCAP). The song was released as a single on Chess Records (label no. 1714) and has since been covered by numerous other artists, sometimes under the title "Run, Run, Rudolph". The song is a 12-bar blues and has a clear musical parallel to Chuck Berry's popular and recognizable song, "Johnny B. Goode" (1958); it is also melodically identical to Berry's "Little Queenie" (1959).
 In Ray Stevens' novelty song "Santa Claus Is Watching You" (1962), Rudolph is replaced on Santa's team by "Clyde the Camel", a character from Stevens' earlier hit, "Ahab the Arab".  In the original version, aimed at children in a similar fashion to "Santa Claus Is Coming to Town", Rudolph was said to be recuperating from an injury sustained during "a twist contest"; a later version, warning a lover away from infidelity because Santa is watching, has Rudolph on a "stakeout at (the lover's) house".

Television and webisodes
 In the Doctor Who promotional mini-webisode "Songtaran Carols" (2012), the Sontaran warrior-nurse-detective Strax stated: "Rudolph the red-nosed reindeer, had a very shiny nose. It proved to be a tactical disadvantage, because it enabled me to punch him in the dark."
 Rudolph, along with Donder and Blitzen, appears in the Doctor Who Christmas special Last Christmas.
 The anime and manga series One Piece has a main character called Tony Tony Chopper, a shapeshifter born on Christmas Eve, who was often discriminated against because of his blue nose. However, his background and story is otherwise very different.
 MadTV featured Rudolph in a parody of the 1964 Rankin-Bass special called Raging Rudolph. Rudolph is beaten up for his red nose, and decides to get revenge on Santa Claus with Hermie the Elf by hiring Yukon Cornelius (a hitman in the special) to kill and decapitate Santa. Rudolph then takes over the North Pole. A sequel to the skit, The Reinfather, shows Rudolph exacting revenge for his hitman's death in a nod to The Godfather.
 In the TV film Once Upon a Christmas (2000), Rudolph makes an appearance when Kathy Ireland's character, Kristin, goes on a sleigh ride with Rudolph leading it. Kristin's sister, Rudolpha, is also mentioned to be named after Rudolph.
 In the Lifetime Christmas movie Becoming Santa (2015), Rudolph is mentioned several times as worrying Mrs. Claus every Christmas because he always shows up to lead the sleigh at the last possible moment. In the last moments of the film, Rudolph shows up right before the sleigh is ready to leave.

Relatives in different adaptations

Parents
 Robert L. May's original book does not name Rudolph's parents.
 The animated specials produced by both Rankin/Bass and GoodTimes Entertainment have given Rudolph different sets of parents:
 In the Rankin/Bass holiday special, his father is Donner and his mother is a tan doe named Mrs. Donner.
 In the GoodTimes retelling, Rudolph's father is Blitzen, and his mother is Mitzi.

Offspring
Three BBC animations carry on the legend by introducing Rudolph's son, Robbie the Reindeer. However, Rudolph is never directly mentioned by name (references are replaced by the first and second films' villain Blitzen interrupting with the phrase, "Don't say that name!", or something similar, presumably for copyright reasons.)

The 2021 HBO Max miniseries Santa Inc. features Junior, who is Rudolph's son and the leader of Santa's A Team of reindeer.

Siblings
Rudolph is also given a younger brother, Rusty Reindeer, in the American special, Holidaze: The Christmas That Almost Didn't Happen (2006). Like in the "Robbie the Reindeer" cartoons, Rudolph's name is not said in the film (though he was referred to as Rudy by an elf at the start of the film) nor does he make a physical appearance. However, he does appear on a poster and one scene in the film shows a cardboard cutout and toys of Rudolph. Unlike previous versions of the character, this Rudolph has a black nose, which is only red when lit up.

Michael Fry and T. Lewis have given Rudolph another brother in a series of Over the Hedge comic strips: an overweight, emotionally damaged reindeer named Ralph, the Infra-Red nosed Reindeer, who is referred to as Rudolph's older brother. Ralph's red nose is good for defrosting Santa's sleigh and warming up toast and waffles; he enviously complains about his brother Rudolph's publicity and his own anonymity.

Aunts, uncles, and cousins
 Rudolph has a cousin, Leroy, in Joe Diffie's 1995 song, "Leroy the Redneck Reindeer" (1995), which tells the story of Leroy's joining the sleigh team to substitute for Rudolph, who was ill.
 In GoodTimes' retelling, three of Santa's reindeer (Dasher, Comet, and Cupid) are his uncles, and Cupid's son Arrow is Rudolph's cousin and rival.

References

External links

 Manuscript of the Montgomery Ward book
 Official Licensor for Rudolph the Red-Nosed Reindeer

 
Christmas children's books
Christian folklore
Literary characters introduced in 1939
Montgomery Ward
Santa Claus in fiction
Santa Claus's reindeer